La Dépêche, formally La Dépêche du Midi, is a regional daily newspaper published in Toulouse in Southwestern France with seventeen editions for different areas of the Midi-Pyrénées region. The main local editions are for Toulouse, Ariège, Aude, Aveyron, Haute-Garonne, Gers, Lot, Lot-et-Garonne, Hautes-Pyrénées, Tarn and Tarn-et-Garonne.

History and profile
The newspaper first appeared on 2 October 1870 when it was called La Dépêche de Toulouse. Publication was prompted by workers at the  Sirven print works in Toulouse, which established the paper's left-leaning politics. It was at La Dépêche that the Socialist politician Jean Jaurès wrote his first articles. The paper also published the articles by Georges Clemenceau. In the big issue of the day, the Dreyfus affair, the paper first insisted Alfred Dreyfus had given army secrets to the Germans but then came out in his support.

The paper fell under German control after the occupation of 1940. Like other newspapers that had collaborated during the war, La Dépêche de Toulouse was closed by the postwar government in 1944. It reappeared under its current name in 1947. Like its predecessor La Dépêche du Midi has a leftist stance.

The newspaper is part of Groupe La Dépêche du Midi. The combined circulation for the 17 regional dailies under La Dépêche du Midi was 200,000 copies in 2006.

References

External links
Official website

1870 establishments in France
Mass media in Toulouse
Daily newspapers published in France
Publications established in 1870